Alexander Hugh McGregor (15 June 1908 – 1 December 1997) was an Australian rules footballer who played for the Geelong Football Club in the Victorian Football League (VFL).

McGregor served in the Australian Army during World War II, serving at both Tobruk and then in New Guinea where he suffered shrapnel wounds to both legs. He was Mentioned in Despatches in early 1944 for his gallant and distinguished service in the South West Pacific.

Notes

External links 

1908 births
1997 deaths
Australian rules footballers from Victoria (Australia)
Geelong Football Club players
People educated at Geelong College